Carter Hart (born August 13, 1998) is a Canadian professional ice hockey goaltender for the Philadelphia Flyers of the National Hockey League (NHL).

Born and raised in Sherwood Park, Alberta, Hart began training with a sport psychologist from the age of ten, and played minor hockey in the Alberta Minor Midget AAA Hockey League. The Everett Silvertips of the Western Hockey League (WHL) selected Hart in the eighth round of the 2013 WHL Bantam Draft. He made his debut with the Silvertips in 2014 at the age of 16, and was the team's starting goaltender by the end of the season. In his time with the Silvertips, Hart was a three-time winner of the Del Wilson Trophy, a two-time CHL Goaltender of the Year, and a recipient of the Four Broncos Memorial Trophy.

The Flyers drafted Hart in the second round of the 2016 NHL Entry Draft; he was the highest-drafted goaltender that year. In 2018, Hart became the youngest goaltender in Flyers history to win his NHL debut, and in 2020, he became the youngest Flyers goaltender to win a postseason game. Internationally, Hart has represented Canada at several international tournaments, including the Ivan Hlinka Memorial Tournament, IIHF World U20 Championship, and Ice Hockey World Championships.

Early life
Hart was born on August 13, 1998, in Sherwood Park, Alberta, to Shauna and John Hart. He originally wanted to be a forward like his father, who played for the NAIT Ooks, but found that he enjoyed making saves more than scoring goals. When Hart was ten years old, his parents hired sport psychologist John Stevenson, who previously worked with NHL player Braden Holtby, as a goaltender coach. When he was growing up, his favorite goaltender was Carey Price of the Montreal Canadiens.

Playing career

Junior
Growing up in Alberta, Hart played minor hockey with the Sherwood Park Squires of the Alberta Minor Midget AAA Hockey League. He won Most Valuable Player (MVP) and Top Goaltender awards at the end of the 2013–14 AMMHL season, with a 1.92 goals against average (GAA) and a .937 save percentage (SV%). After Hart was selected in the eighth round (158th overall) in the 2013 WHL Bantam Draft, he signed with the Everett Silvertips of the Western Hockey League (WHL) on February 12, 2014. He made his career start at age 16 in the 2014–15 WHL season opener, recording a 26-save shutout against the Seattle Thunderbirds. After displacing starting goaltender Austin Lotz in March 2015, Hart finished his rookie season with an 18–5–2–3 record and the lowest GAA (2.29) and second-highest save percentage (.915) in the WHL. He started every game in the Silvertips' playoff series (including their first-round, triple-overtime win against the Spokane Chiefs), and finished the series with a 2.28 GAA and .929 SV%.

Hart had another successful year in his second season with the Silvertips, recording six shutouts in 21 games and finishing the season with the most wins in the WHL (a 35–23–1–3 record) and a 2.14 GAA. He received the CHL Goaltender of the Year award, the Del Wilson Trophy for the top goaltender in the WHL, and MVP for the Silvertips organization. Hart was named a WHL West First Team All-Star for the season.

Before the 2016 NHL Entry Draft, Hart was considered a top goaltender prospect. The NHL Central Scouting Bureau named him the top available North American goaltender in its 2016 midterm rankings, and second in its final ratings. He appeared in the 2016 CHL/NHL Top Prospects Game, playing for Team Orr. Hart was drafted in the second round, 48th overall, by the Philadelphia Flyers of the National Hockey League (NHL)the first goaltender selected in 2016and signed an entry-level contract with the Flyers organization on October 2 of that year. He returned to the Silvertips for the 2016–17 WHL season, winning back-to-back CHL Goaltender of the Week awards in November 2016. Hart finished the season with a 32–11–6–2 record and led the WHL in goals against average (1.99), save percentage (.927) and shutouts (9), again receiving the Silvertips' MVP award and the Del Wilson Trophy.

Hart missed the first month of his 2017–18 WHL season after contracting mononucleosis, which fatigued him and made him lose . He had played only two games, a win against the Kelowna Rockets on September 29 and a loss to the Tri-City Americans the following day, when he was diagnosed. Hart returned in November and soon recorded his 21st career shutout against the Prince Albert Raiders, tying Leland Irving for the most shutout games in Silvertips history. He recorded his 26th career shutout (against the Vancouver Giants) on February 11, 2018, tying Tyson Sexsmith for the most career WHL shutouts. Hart finished the season with a 31–6–1–3 record, a 1.60 GAA, a 0.947 SV%, and seven shutouts. In addition to receiving the Silvertips MVP award, and the Del Wilson Trophy for the third consecutive year, he was named CHL Goaltender of the Year for the 2017–18 seasonthe first goaltender in league history to receive the award twice. Hart received the Everett Silvertips Community Relations Award, and the Four Broncos Memorial Trophy, awarded to the WHL Player of the Year. He ended his WHL career with an overall 116–46–19 record, a 2.01 GAA, a .927 save percentage, and 26 shutouts.

Professional
Hart began the 2018–19 season with the Lehigh Valley Phantoms, the Flyers' American Hockey League (AHL) affiliate, earning his first professional-career shutout on December 10, 2018, in a 1–0 win against the Hershey Bears. His AHL career was short-lived, since he was recalled by the Flyers a week later after goaltender Anthony Stolarz was placed on the injured reserve list. Hart was to be one of eight goaltenders used by the Philadelphia Flyers in the 2018–19 NHL season, a league record.

He made his NHL debut on December 18 in a 3–2 victory over the Detroit Red Wings, the youngest goaltender since Carey Price to win his NHL debut and the youngest in Flyers history. Recording his fourth straight NHL win against the Winnipeg Jets on January 28, Hart was the first NHL player since Steve Mason to have four consecutive victories as a starting goaltender before age 21. He was named the NHL Rookie of the Month on January 29 with a 6–2–1 record, a 2.33 GAA and a .931 SV%, and was named the Second Star of the Week for the week of February 4 with a 3–0–0 record and a six-game winning streak.

Hart began the Flyers' 2019–20 season training camp weighing ,  more than the previous season. On October 9, after defeating the New Jersey Devils in a 4–0 home opener, he was the youngest goaltender in Flyers history to record a shutout at the age of 21 years and 57 days. After straining a lower right abdominal muscle during practice on January 15, Hart missed nine consecutive games before returning on February 10 in a 4–1 victory against the Florida Panthers. When the season was suspended on March 12 due to the COVID-19 pandemic in North America, Hart had a 24–13–3 record, a 2.42 GAA, and a .914 SV%.

When the NHL resumed for the 2020 Stanley Cup playoffs in Toronto, Hart was one of 31 Flyers selected for the bubble. He made his postseason debut on August 2, winning a round-robin game against the Boston Bruins. Hart made 34 saves in the 4–1 victory, becoming the youngest Flyers goaltender to win a postseason game. He posted back-to-back playoff shoutouts on August 16 and 18 against the Montreal Canadiens, becoming the second-youngest goaltender in NHL history to do so. On August 21, Hart saved 31 shots to give Philadelphia the series win against the Canadiens. The Flyers lost the second Eastern Conference round to the New York Islanders, with Hart taking the 4–0 game-seven loss to end the series on September 3, 2020.

He struggled at the beginning of the 2020–21 season, allowing four or more goals in three consecutive starts for the first time in his career. After a 6–1 loss against the Bruins on January 23, Hart broke his stick on the net before he stormed off the ice. He later apologized, calling the outburst "unprofessional" and a decision made in "the heat of the moment." Hart was particularly bedeviled by the Bruins, to whom he gave up three goals in under two minutes in an eventual 7–3 loss at the NHL Outdoors at Lake Tahoe game on February 21. After a March 25 game against the New York Rangers, Flyers coach Alain Vigneault asked Hart to take an eight-day "reset" to focus on improving his game. He returned on April 3 in a 3–2 shootout loss against the Islanders. After being scratched on April 17, the Flyers shut Hart down for the season on April 29 due to a sprained medial collateral ligament in his left knee. He finished the season 9–11–5 with a 3.67 GAA and .877 SV%.

Hart, a restricted free agent during the 2021 offseason, signed a three-year contract extension with an average annual value of $3.979 million on August 9. He recorded his first shutout of the season on November 2, making 29 saves in a 3–0 victory over the Arizona Coyotes. On December 27, 2021, Hart was placed on the NHL's COVID-19 protocol list.

Playing style
In a 2016 scouting report, NHL Central Scouting noted Hart's "focused and consistent technique with positioning and crease management" and his "strong lateral movement while keeping his body controlled." He uses a reactive-blocking technique rather than the butterfly style which he believes many goaltenders employ: "I'm not a guy who just drops right down, squats and hopes it hits you."

Attention has been paid to the mental aspects of Hart's performance. Part of his work with Stevenson has involved improving his focus and optimism before a game, and he has been praised by Silvertips head coach Dennis Williams for his "calm, cool and collected" demeanor on the ice; according to Flyers teammate James van Riemsdyk, his temperament on the ice is "the best quality I think he has." Hart practices vision training to increase his visual acuity and perception and better process an approaching puck. He also juggles and uses concentration grids, a technique which involves crossing off a randomized grid of numbers in order from one to 100, to improve his focus. Hart admits being a perfectionist, and hopes to become the NHL's best goaltender.

International play

Hart and the Peterborough Petes' Dylan Wells were selected as goaltenders for Hockey Canada at the 2015 Ivan Hlinka Memorial Tournament. Hart began the tournament with 15 saves against the Czech Republic for a 3–1 victory. He made 13 saves in his next starting appearance: a 9–2 win against Switzerland to take Canada to the semifinals. Canada went on to defeat Sweden in the gold-medal match.

Hart was next selected to represent Canada at the 2017 World Junior Ice Hockey Championships. Brought in as the starting goaltender, he was sidelined after allowing three goals in 17 shots by Russia and was called up again only when Connor Ingram gave up two goals in three shots by Sweden. After making 31 saves in the gold-medal game against the United States, Hart gave up a shootout goal by Troy Terry to give Canada the silver medal. He was again chosen, with Michael DiPietro this time, for the 2018 World Junior Ice Hockey Championships. After recording a 23-save shutout against the Czech Republic in pre-tournament play, Hart was named Canada's starter. Canada defeated Sweden in the gold-medal match, and Hart ended the tournament with a 5–0–1 record, tying the Canadian world junior career record at 8–0–2.

Hart and fellow Flyer Sean Couturier were named to Canada's roster for the 2019 IIHF World Championship, coached by recently-appointed Flyers head coach Alain Vigneault. He served as backup goaltender to Matt Murray. Hart recorded 22 saves in 50 minutes in his first game of the championship, against Denmark in the Group A preliminary round, combining with Mackenzie Blackwood for the shutout. Canada advanced to the gold-medal game, losing 3–1 to Finland for the silver medal.

Career statistics

Regular season and playoffs

International

Awards and honours

References

External links

1998 births
Living people
Canadian ice hockey goaltenders
Everett Silvertips players
Ice hockey people from Alberta
Lehigh Valley Phantoms players
Philadelphia Flyers draft picks
Philadelphia Flyers players
Sportspeople from Sherwood Park